Papilio montrouzieri, occasionally referred to as Montrouzier's Ulysses, is a species of swallowtail butterfly from the genus Papilio that is endemic to New Caledonia. It resembles the more widespread relative, Papilio ulysses. Its name refers to French entomologist, explorer and priest Xavier Montrouzier.

See also
 Biodiversity of New Caledonia

References

Erich Bauer and Thomas Frankenbach, 1998 Schmetterlinge der Erde, Butterflies of the World Part I (1), Papilionidae Papilionidae I: Papilio, Subgenus Achillides, Bhutanitis, Teinopalpus. Edited by Erich Bauer and Thomas Frankenbach.  Keltern: Goecke & Evers; Canterbury: Hillside Books,  plate 9, figure 6

External links

The Global Butterfly Information System Images of syntype

montrouzieri
Butterflies described in 1859